Lluís López Mármol (born 5 March 1997) is a Spanish professional footballer who plays for Real Zaragoza as a central defender.

Club career
Born in Sant Joan de Vilatorrada, Barcelona, Catalonia, López joined RCD Espanyol's youth setup in 2005, aged eight, after starting out at Club Gimnàstic Manresa. On 4 June 2015 he was promoted to the reserves, being also called up to the main squad for pre-season on 9 July.

López made his senior debut on 23 August 2015, starting and being booked in a 1–0 home win against Lleida Esportiu in the Segunda División B. He scored his first goal in the category on 4 October, netting his team's only in a 1–1 draw against Valencia CF Mestalla also at the Ciutat Esportiva Dani Jarque; thirteen days later, he scored a brace in a 4–5 home loss against CD Eldense.

On 6 July 2018, López renewed his contract until 2022, being definitely promoted to the main squad ahead of the 2019–20 campaign. He made his first-team debut on 1 November, coming on as a second-half substitute for injured Naldo in a 1–2 away loss against Cádiz CF, in the season's Copa del Rey.

López made his La Liga debut on 21 January 2019, playing the full 90 minutes in a 0–3 away loss against SD Eibar. On 30 January of the following year, after being rarely used, he was loaned to Segunda División side CD Tenerife until the end of the season.

Upon returning, López featured in 18 matches during the 2020–21 season, as the Pericos returned to the top tier. On 18 August 2021, he terminated his contract with the club, and signed a two-year deal with Real Zaragoza in the second division just hours later.

References

External links
Espanyol official profile 

Living people
1997 births
People from Bages
Sportspeople from the Province of Barcelona
Association football defenders
Spanish footballers
Footballers from Catalonia
La Liga players
Segunda División B players
Tercera División players
RCD Espanyol B footballers
RCD Espanyol footballers
CD Tenerife players
Real Zaragoza players
Spain youth international footballers